USC&GS Explorer may refer to more than one ship of the United States Coast and Geodetic Survey:

 , a survey ship in service from 1904 to 1918 and from 1919 to 1939
 , an ocean survey ship (OSS) in commission from 1940 to 1968

Ships of the United States Coast and Geodetic Survey